James Blyth Galloway (3 July 1893 – 17 November 1918) was a Scottish professional footballer who played in the Scottish League for Third Lanark as a centre forward.

Personal life 
Galloway worked as an architect. A territorial, he was called up for service when the First World War broke out in August 1914 and joined the Royal Field Artillery. After a long period on the Western Front, he was commissioned as a second lieutenant on 16 September 1917. Galloway was posted to India late in the war and died of pneumonia in Kasauli on 17 November 1918, just six days after the end of the war. He was buried in Kasauli Cemetery.

Career statistics

References 

1893 births
1918 deaths
People from Buckhaven
Scottish footballers
British Army personnel of World War I
Royal Field Artillery officers
Scottish Football League players
Third Lanark A.C. players
Scottish architects
Deaths from pneumonia in India
Association football forwards
British military personnel killed in World War I
Footballers from Fife